Tulsi Gowda is an Indian environmentalist from Honnali village, Ankola taluk in Karnataka state. She has planted more than 30,000 saplings and looks after the nurseries of the Forest Department. Her work has been honoured by the Government of India and other organisations. In 2021, the Government of India awarded her the Padma Shri, the country's fourth highest civilian award. She is known as the "Encyclopedia of the Forest" for her ability to recognise the mother tree of any species of tree.

Early life 
Tulsi Gowda was born in 1944 into the Halakki tribal family within the Honnalli village, a settlement transitioning between rural and urban within the Uttara Kannada district in the Indian state of Karnataka. Karnataka is a state in South India known for its eco-tourism, with over twenty-five wildlife sanctuaries and five national parks.

Gowda was born into an impoverished family, and her father died when she was 2 years old, so she had to work alongside her mother as a day labourer at a local nursery once she was old enough. She did not receive a formal education or learn to read. At a young age, she was married off to an older man named Govinde Gowda. She does not know her exact age when the marriage began, though she was estimated to be around 10 to 12 years old. Her husband died when she was in her 50s.

At the nursery, Gowda was responsible for taking care of the seeds that were to be grown and harvested at the Karnataka Forestry Department, and specifically for seeds intended as a part of the Agasur seedbed. Gowda continued working at the nursery alongside her mother as a daily wage worker for 35 years until she was offered a permanent position in recognition of her work towards conservation, and her knowledge of botany. She worked at the nursery in this permanent position for 15 years before retiring at the age of seventy. During her time at the nursery, she contributed and worked directly on the afforestation efforts of the forest department by using traditional knowledge of the land. As well as planting saplings, she worked to prevent poachers and forest fires from destroying the wildlife.

Career and awards 

Gowda spent over sixty years working at the Karnataka Forest Department. This is made up of one community reserve, five tiger reserves, fifteen conservation reserves and thirty wildlife sanctuaries. It describes its aim as reconnecting communities and villages with nature, working towards a future where one-third of the area of the state has forest or tree cover.

In 1986, Gowda received the Indira Priyadarshini Vrikshamitra Award, also known as the IPVM award. The IPVM award recognizes pioneering contributions made by individuals or institutions to afforestation and wasteland development.

In 1999, Gowda received the Karnataka Rajyotsava Award, sometimes known as the Kannada Rajyotsava Award, the "second highest civilian honour of the Karnataka state of India". It is given yearly to distinguished citizens of Karnataka State aged over sixty.

On November 8, 2020, the Government of India awardeed Gowda the Padma Shri award, the fourth highest award given to citizens of India. The Padma Shri, also commonly spelled as Padma Shree, is an award given every year on India's Republic Day by the Government of India. Gowda said that, while she is glad to have received the Padma Shri, she "values the forests and trees more".

Knowledge 
Gowda is known by environmentalists as the "Encyclopedia of the Forest" and by her tribe as the "tree goddess" because of her knowledge of the forest and its plants. She is known for her ability to identify the mother tree of every species of tree in the forest no matter where it is. Mother trees are significant because of their age and size, which make them the most connected nodes in the forest. These underground nodes are used to connect mother trees with saplings and seedlings as the mother tree exchanges nitrogen and nutrients. Gowda is also an expert in seed collecting, the extraction of seeds from mother trees in order to regenerate and regrow entire plant species. It is a difficult process as the seeds must be collected at the peak of germination from the mother tree in order to ensure the survival of the seedlings and Gowda is able to work out this exact time.

Gowda cannot explain how she gathered her knowledge of the forest, but says it is as if she can "speak the language of the forest." In the traditions of her tribe, the Halakki Vokkaliga, the matriarchy is connected to nature and cares for the land.

Legacy 
Gowda is estimated to have planted in the range of one lakh (100,000) trees in Karnataka on her own. These contributions have made a lasting impact on the members of her community as well. Nagaraja Gowda of Uttara Kannada District, who works for the welfare of the Halakki tribe, says Gowda is the pride of their community: "she has invaluable knowledge of the forest and medicinal plants. Nobody has documented it and she is not a good communicator, so it is difficult to understand her contribution unless you've seen her work."

Yellappa Reddy, a retired officer, also commends Gowda's lasting commitment to her community, citing the fact that Gowda has planted and identified over 300 medicinal plants that have since been used to treat ailments within their village.

Although Gowda has retired from the Karnataka Forestry Department, she continues to teach the children of her village about the importance of the forest as well as how to find and care for seeds.

Gowda has also championed women's rights within her village. When another Halakki woman was threatened with a gun after an altercation, Gowda came to her aid stating that she will "protest fiercely if the perpetrator of the crime isn't punished."

See also 

 Halakki Vokkaliga
 Karnataka
 Botany
 Environmental protection

References

Living people
Indian environmentalists
People from Uttara Kannada
Indian women environmentalists
Women from Karnataka
Activists from Karnataka
20th-century Indian women
20th-century Indian people
Recipients of the Padma Shri in social work
1944 births